James C. Reynolds (July 17, 1849 – September 4, 1933) was a member of the Wisconsin State Assembly and the Wisconsin State Senate.

Biography
Reynolds was born on July 17, 1849 in Exeter, Wisconsin. He attended Beloit College, Racine College, Rush Medical College, and Bellevue Hospital Medical College. He died in Lake Geneva, Wisconsin in 1933.

Political career
Reynolds was a member of the Assembly during the 1885 and 1887 sessions and represented the 8th District of the Senate during the 1889 and 1891 sessions. He was a delegate to the 1900 Republican National Convention and a member of the village board of Lake Geneva.

References

External links
The Political Graveyard—Reynolds

People from Green County, Wisconsin
People from Lake Geneva, Wisconsin
Republican Party Wisconsin state senators
Republican Party members of the Wisconsin State Assembly
Wisconsin city council members
Physicians from Wisconsin
Beloit College alumni
Racine College alumni
Rush Medical College alumni
1849 births
1933 deaths